Tsing Yi North Coastal Road, also abbreviated as TYNCR, is a dual carriageway in Tsing Yi, Hong Kong. The road starts at Tsing Tsuen Road, where it travels through the northern part of the island. It ends at Route 3 and Route 8 on the western side of the island at a left-in/left-out interchange,  from its eastern terminus. The road was first planned in 1998 to relieve traffic coming from Lantau. It was constructed in 1999, and was opened on 2 February 2002.

Description

The road starts at the border of the Tsing Ma Control Area, on the eastern exit ramps of the Tam Kon Shan Interchange and the western terminus of Tsing Tsuen Road. The road travels westward, with ramps reemerging from the interchange, which is surrounded by noise barriers. TYNCR then travels across multiple viaducts on the northern side of Tsing Yi, with hills south of the road, and the coastline north of it. About  from the eastern terminus, TYNCR travels to Tam Kon Shan Road, near a shipyard and a cement factory. The exit ramp is accessible from westbound lanes, and the entrance ramp from Tam Kon Shan Road to eastbound lanes. The road continues eastward and ends at a left-in/left-out intersection, located east of the Lantau Link Visitors Centre. The interchange then connects to Routes 3 and 8.

In 2018, 23,440 vehicles travelled the part of the road between Tam Kon Shan Interchange West End and the slip roads to and from Tam Kon Shan Road which is classified as a Primary Distributor (PD) by the Transport Department, while 14,400 vehicles travelled the part of the road between Tsing Tsuen Road and Tam Kon Shan Interchange West End which is classified as a District Distributor (DD). The data are measured in average annual daily traffic (AADT), which measures the amount of traffic daily on average.

History
Planning for the road began around 1996, as part of the Tsing Ma Control Area, a small region of highways with special management. The road was to relieve the higher traffic traveling through Tsing Yi, especially with the new Hong Kong International Airport and developments in Lantau being built. The project included the road and its ramps, pedestrian pathways, noise barriers around the highway, surveillance system, and a maintenance centre in Tsing Yi. The Highways Department signed a contract with Gammon Construction Limited for HKD$775.6 million in February 1999, after it invited qualified contractors in October 1998. Construction began later that month.

During construction, techniques were used to prevent air pollution. Water was sprayed on roads, vehicles, and other areas to keep dust from leaving the site. Multiple viaducts, road embankments, and retaining walls were constructed in the project, with a set of walls replaced after its footings were damaged. Construction of the traffic control system began in November 2000, after the Transport Department signed an agreement with ABB Industrial and Building Systems Limited. The road was opened on 2 February 2002, after Donald Tsang inaugurated the road in a ceremony on February 1. New speed limits were set to  upon opening.

Major intersections

See also
 List of streets and roads in Hong Kong
 Penny's Bay Highway
 Sha Lek Highway

References

External links

Tsing Yi North Coastal Road Environmental Impact Assessment

Tsing Yi
Expressways in Hong Kong

Viaducts in Hong Kong
Roads in the New Territories